|}

References

Buildings and structures in Malabon
Malabon